Dowra is a village and townland in northwest County Cavan, Ireland. Located in a valley on Lough Allen,  it is the first village on, and marks the most uppermost navigable point of, the River Shannon. On one side of its bridge is County Cavan; on the other is County Leitrim. The nucleus of the village is situated on the Cavan side. It is located on the junction of the R200 and R207 regional roads.

Transport
Bus Éireann route 462 serves Dowra on Saturdays only linking it to Drumkeeran, Dromahair and Sligo.

History
The village was formed in the late 19th century after another village close by, Tober, was washed away by landslides in the summer of 1863. Back in 1925, Dowra village comprised 18 houses, with 10 being licensed to sell alcohol.

The remains of the Black Pig's Dyke can be seen outside the village. It is noted on the Ordnance Survey's Edition of 1911 Six-inch to One-mile map, 1/2 mile west of Dowra alongside the River Shannon (forming part of the Leitrim / Cavan border) - see Leitrim Sheet 5. It is again noted 3/4 mile downstream just below where the Owennayla River joins the Shannon on the east side of Canbeg Township, Co. Leitrim - see Leitrim Sheet 18.

Places of interest
The source of the River Shannon, known as the Shannon Pot is located about 12 km (7 miles) to the north. The Cavan Way hiking trail starts in the village and the Leitrim Way passes through it. The Miners' Way is nearby.

Restoration of Dowra Courthouse was completed in 2014 with the new building opening as a Community Creative Arts Space.

Economy
The main industries in the locality are agriculture, forestry and construction. There is a livestock market held every Saturday.

Education
The local national school is in County Leitrim, just across the bridge from the village centre.

Religion
The village church is located approximately 5 km north and is called the Church of the Immaculate Conception, Doobally.

See also
 List of towns and villages in Ireland
The Dowra affair

References

Towns and villages in County Cavan
Townlands of County Cavan
Populated places on the River Shannon